Kirillovo is a rural locality (a village) in Igmasskoye Rural Settlement, Nyuksensky District, Vologda Oblast, Russia. The population was 5 as of 2002.

Geography 
Kirillovo is located 44 km southwest of Nyuksenitsa (the district's administrative centre) by road. Igmas is the nearest rural locality.

References 

Rural localities in Nyuksensky District